Spry Harbour is a rural community on the Eastern Shore of Nova Scotia, Canada, in the Halifax Regional Municipality, located along the Marine Drive on Nova Scotia Trunk 7. The community is located around Taylor Bay and Spry Harbour, inlets of the Atlantic Ocean.

References

Communities in Halifax, Nova Scotia
General Service Areas in Nova Scotia